The river Neris or Viliya rises in northern Belarus. It flows westward, passing through Vilnius (Lithuania's capital) and in the south-centre of that country it flows into the Nemunas (Neman), at Kaunas, as its main tributary.

For , after passing through Belarus, the river runs  through Lithuania.

The Neris connects successive Lithuanian capitals – Kernavė and Vilnius. Along its banks are burial places of the pagan Lithuanians. At  from Vilnius are the old burial mounds of Karmazinai, with many mythological stones and a sacred oak.

Dual naming

The reasons for the dual naming of the river as Neris by the Lithuanians and Viliya (formerly Velja, meaning "big, great" in Slavic) by the Slavs are complex. Even in Vilnius, there are toponyms including both names, e. g. Neris remains in the riverside names of Paneriai and Paneriškės while Velja is a part of the name Valakampiai, which means "an angle of Velja" in Lithuanian. In Kaunas, a part of the city by the Neris river, that was formerly a separate town, is also named Vilijampolė (Vilija + polis, that means "polis by Vilija").

Although it has been suggested that Neris is the primeval name of the river, while the name Viliya is of secondary extraction, the dual naming most probably emerged from the confluence of the rivers Neris (now known as Narach River, leaving Lake Narach) and Velja, in the historical Slavic/Baltic borderland, each ethnos choosing their own name for the river starting at the confluence. It is moreover evidenced by the fact that the name Neris was never used to name the river Velja up to this confluence. Therefore, it has been proposed that the Narach River had in fact been considered the upper reaches of Neris by the Balts in ancient times.

Etymology of "Neris"
The name Neris is of Baltic origin, a cognate of the Lithuanian nerti generally meaning "to dive, swim downstream" as well as "to net, crochet". It is likely that the name had a more general meaning of "flow" or particularly "swift and swirling flow" in early times.

Etymologically, the name is one of a class of hydronyms, widespread in the modern and prehistoric Baltic ranges; e.g., Lithuanian Narotis, Narasa (rivers), Narutis (lake), Old Prussian Narus, Nara near Moscow. These are related to Lithuanian narus, "deep", and nerti, "to dive".

More remote connections are obscure, although the root is believed to be Indo-European. There are a number of possibilities:

Pokorny's 2nd *ner-, "under" (Indogermanisches etymologisches Wörterbuch, pp765–766);
Derksen's *, o-grade * (Slavic Inherited Lexicon);
A relation to the Greek god Nereus, which may be from *snau-, "to give milk to", in the sense of "flow" (Partridge, Origins (1983)).
 Another relationship of "Neris" with the Sanskrit word "Neer"/"Naar" which means water.

Basin

Basin within Belarus
The river is called Viliya in Belarus. Belarus's largest reservoir, Vileyka Reservoir, is located by Viliya, near the Vileyka city.

Right tributaries
Narach
Servach
Stracha

Left tributaries
Iliya
Usha
Ashmyanka

Basin within Lithuania
The watershed within Lithuania is

Tributaries
Verkė
Vilnia
Vokė
Bražuolė
Dūkšta
Musė
Laukysta
Lomena
Šventoji
Lokys
Šešuva
Saidė

Notes and references

External links
 

Neris basin
Rivers of Grodno Region
Rivers of Minsk Region
Rivers of Lithuania
International rivers of Europe
Belarus–Lithuania border
Paneriai
Rivers of Belarus